Mänttä is a former town and municipality of Finland. It was merged with the municipality of Vilppula to form Mänttä-Vilppula on 1 January 2009.

The place name Mänttä comes from an old house which Tuomas Niilonpoika Mäntsä (1570–1618) founded in Keuruskoski in the wilderness of Sääksmäki.

It was located in the province of Western Finland and was part of the Pirkanmaa region. The population density was 100.0 inhabitants per km².

The municipality was unilingually Finnish.

Finnish naval officer Eero Rahola was born in Mänttä, as well as World Speed Skating Championships medalist Pekka Koskela.

Twin towns – sister cities

Mänttä is twinned with:
 Stary Oskol, Russia

References

External links

Mänttä-Vilppula – Official site

Populated places disestablished in 2009
2009 disestablishments in Finland
Former municipalities of Finland
Mänttä-Vilppula